Natur & Kultur is a Swedish publishing foundation with head office in Stockholm known for an extensive series of teaching materials. Its logotype is an apple tree.

Overview 
The publishing house was founded in 1922 by Johan Hansson and his wife Jenny Bergqvist Hansson, with a focus on educational and didactic works of literature. During the Second World War, it published anti-Nazi literature. It was transformed into a foundation in 1947.

In the 1980s and 1990s, Natur & Kultur bought a number of other publishing houses, such as Askild & Kärnekull Förlag AB, (later renamed to Legenda) and LTs Förlag. In addition to textbooks for different levels of education, Natur & Kultur also publishes literary classics and mainstream literature.

References

External links

Book publishing companies of Sweden
Publishing companies established in 1922
Swedish companies established in 1922
Companies based in Stockholm